Harborplace is a shopping complex on the Inner Harbor in Baltimore, Maryland.

Description 
The property is composed of 2 two-story pavilions: the Pratt Street Pavilion and the Light Street Pavilion. Each of these buildings contains many stores and restaurants. There are several stores that sell merchandise specific to Baltimore or the state of Maryland, such as blue crab food products, Baltimore Orioles and Baltimore Ravens merchandise, Edgar Allan Poe products, and University of Maryland Terrapins clothing. National retailers and restaurants include Bubba Gump Shrimp Company, The Cheesecake Factory, Johnny Rockets, Build-A-Bear Workshop, Crystal Cove, H&M, and Uno Pizzeria & Grill.

History
Harborplace was designed by Benjamin C. Thompson and was built by The Rouse Company near the former Light Street site of the Baltimore Steam Packet Company's steamship terminal and docks. A citywide referendum was required to proceed with the project, championed by then Baltimore Mayor William Donald Schaefer. 

Harborplace opened on July 2, 1980, as a centerpiece of the revival of downtown Baltimore.

On the weekend of July 1, 2005, Harborplace celebrated its 25th anniversary with a ceremony featuring Maryland Governor Robert L. Ehrlich, Baltimore Mayor Martin J. O'Malley, and Baltimore Area Convention & Visitors Association (BACVA) president Leslie R. Doggett.

A Ripley's Believe It or Not! Odditorium museum opened in the Light Street Pavilion on June 26, 2012, and closed in May 2020.

In November 2012, the property was sold to Ashkenazy Acquisitions for $100 million.

On June 3, 2019, the Baltimore Business Journal reported that as of May 30, 2019, Harborplace was placed into court-ordered receivership and that Azkenazy Acquisitions lost both management and ownership of Harborplace as a result. The BBJ reported that the Baltimore Circuit Court had appointed IVL Group, LLC of Monclair, NJ to manage, maintain, lease, provide security for Harborplace, the receivership order also authorizes IVL Group to seek a new buyer.

In April 2022, the Baltimore development firm MCB Real Estate entered into an agreement to purchase Harborplace. The deal was finalized by the Baltimore City Circuit Court in December 2022.

See also

References

1980 establishments in Maryland
Buildings and structures in Baltimore
Inner Harbor, Baltimore
Shopping malls in Maryland
Shopping districts and streets in the United States
History of Baltimore
Landmarks in Baltimore
Tourist attractions in Baltimore